Adam Beckman (born May 10, 2001) is a Canadian professional ice hockey forward currently playing for the Iowa Wild in the American Hockey League (AHL) as a prospect to the Minnesota Wild of the National Hockey League (NHL). He was drafted by the Wild in the third round, 75th overall, in the 2019 NHL Entry Draft and eventually made his debut on October 30, 2021.

Early life
Beckman was born on May 10, 2001, in Saskatoon, Saskatchewan, to parents Janet and Dale. He is the youngest of three siblings, with an older brother and older sister. His sister Sydney also played ice hockey growing up, while his cousins Grace and Sophie are collegiate athletes for the Wisconsin Badgers.

Playing career

Junior
Growing up in Saskatoon, Beckman played with the Saskatoon Frostbite U15 AA and Battleford Stars of the Saskatchewan Midget AAA League. During his time with the Stars, Beckman tallied 15 goals and 26 assists for 41 points through 44 games and was drafted 96th overall by the Spokane Chiefs in the 2016 Western Hockey League (WHL) Bantam Draft. Following the draft, he played in five pre-season games with the Chiefs before being re-assigned to the Saskatoon Minor Hockey League (SMHL). He finished the 2017–18 season with the Battlefords Stars as the league’s leading scorer with 78 points.

Beckman joined the Chiefs for their 2018–19 season while attending Joel E. Ferris High School. Although he began the season with no ranking from the NHL Central Scouting Bureau, he began to lead the league in goals scored by a rookie with eight and caught the attention of NHL scouts and earned a "C" rating in November as a potential 4th-6th round pick in the draft. By April 2019, Beckman became the first rookie in franchise history to lead the team in goals since Daniel Bohac in the 1998-99 season. He finished the season with 62 points to rank second on the franchise's list of most goals by a first-year player. As a result, Beckman jumped up 10 spots in the NHL Central Scouting Final Rankings to rank 34th amongst North American skaters, Beckman was invited to participate in the NHL Scouting Combine. He was eventually drafted in the third round, 75th overall, by the Minnesota Wild.

Following the 2019 NHL Entry Draft, Beckman participated in their training camp and was selected to play in the CHL Canada/Russia Series. During a game against the Portland Winterhawks in January 2020, Beckman set a Spokane Chiefs franchise record for longest goal steak with 10. On March 5, 2020, Beckman became the first player in the league to reach 100 points during the 2019–20 season. At the time of this milestone, Beckman had recorded 44 goals and 56 assists through 60 games. He later added to that total and concluded the season with 48 goals and 59 assists for 107 points in 63 games to win the Bob Clarke Trophy as the WHL's top scorer. A month later, Beckman was again recognized for his career-best season with the WHL Western Conference Player of the Year and a selection onto the Western Conference First All-Star Team.

Professional
On October 9, 2021, Beckman was re-assigned to the Wild's American Hockey League affiliate, the Iowa Wild, to begin the season. He was recalled to the NHL level at the end of October and made his NHL debut on October 30, against the Colorado Avalanche. Upon making his debut, Beckman became the fourth player during the 2021–22 season and 92nd in team history to make his NHL debut with the Wild.

International play
In the summer of 2020, Beckman was invited to participate in Team Canada's National Junior Team Summer Development Camp.

Career statistics

Awards and honours

References

External links
 

2001 births
Living people
Ice hockey people from Saskatchewan
Iowa Wild players
Minnesota Wild players
Minnesota Wild draft picks
Nipawin Hawks players
Spokane Chiefs players
Sportspeople from Saskatoon